Višňovský is a surname. Notable people with the surname include:

Ľubomír Višňovský (born 1976), Slovak ice hockey player, brother of Tibor
Tibor Višňovský (born 1974), Slovak ice hockey player

Slovak-language surnames